The distal-gland springsnail, scientific name Pyrgulopsis nanus, is a species of freshwater snails with a gill and an operculum, aquatic gastropod mollusks in the family Hydrobiidae. This species is endemic to the United States.

References

Endemic fauna of the United States
Pyrgulopsis
Gastropods described in 1987
Taxonomy articles created by Polbot